NCSS may refer to:

National Center for Sports Safety
National Computer Science School
National Cooperative Soil Survey
National Council for the Social Studies
National Council of Social Service (Singapore)
National Council of Social Services (United Kingdom)
National CSS, a computer time-sharing vendor of the 60s-80s
NCSS (statistical software)
Northwoods Community Secondary School